La Crosse Hotel is a historic hotel building located at La Crosse, Mecklenburg County, Virginia. It was built in 1917, and is a two-story, eight bay, brick building with a rear ell and a hipped roof covered with standing seam metal and pressed metal shingles.  The front façade features a full width front porch combining Colonial Revival and American Craftsman details.

It was listed on the National Register of Historic Places in 2008.

References

Hotel buildings on the National Register of Historic Places in Virginia
Colonial Revival architecture in Virginia
Hotel buildings completed in 1917
Buildings and structures in Mecklenburg County, Virginia
National Register of Historic Places in Mecklenburg County, Virginia